Strusivka former village in Ukraine, now - the street of the same name and part of the village of Shmankivtsi, Chortkiv Raion, Ternopil Oblast, Ukraine.

Toponymy 
The name has an anthroponymic origin, i.e. the name originated from a personal name. It is possible that Strus was a representative of the branch of the Polish nobility Strus.

History 
Emerged in the early XVIII century.

Religion 
In the village there was a wooden Saint Yoan Bohoslov church (wooden, lost).

References

Sources 
 Strusivka (Strosivka) // Chortkiv district. Historical and memoir collection / ed. board of O. Sonevytska and others. - Paris - Sydney - Toronto: NTSh, Ukrainian Archives, 1974. - Vol. XXVII. - S. 232.

Chortkiv Raion